Jaydn Ott (boron December 16, 2002) is an American football running back for the California Golden Bears.

Early life and high school
Ott grew up in Norco, California and initially attended Norco High School. He committed to play college football at Oregon as a freshman in high school. After his freshman year Ott moved to Las Vegas, Nevada and transferred to Bishop Gorman High School. As a sophomore, Ott rushed for 11.7 yards per carry.  He returned to Norco before the start of his senior year. Ott rushed for 1,140 yards and 17 touchdowns on 114 carries as a senior. Ott decommitted from Oregon during his sophomore year and later committed to play at California. He re-opened his recruitment as a senior, but ultimately signed a National Letter of Intent to play at Cal.

College career
Ott rushed for 104 yards on 17 carries and caught two passes for 26 yards and one touchdown in his collegiate debut against UC Davis. He rushed for 274 yards, the third-most in a game in school history, and three touchdowns in a 49–31 win over Arizona in week 4.

Ott was named a Freshman All-American for the 2022 season.

References

External links
California Golden Bears bio

Living people
American football running backs
California Golden Bears football players
Players of American football from California
People from Norco, California
2002 births